Write Me A Murder is a mystery play in three acts by Frederick Knott, which premiered on Broadway at the Belasco Theatre on October 26, 1961, presented by the Compass Productions, Inc., directed by George Schaefer, stage design by Warren Clymer, costume design by Noel Taylor. It totally ran for 196 performances, closing on April 14, 1962 at the Belasco Theatre.

Original production
Write Me A Murder opened at the Belasco Theater on October 24, 1961, and ran for 196 performances.

Plot
The play tells the story of the brothers Clive and David Rodingham, who inherit the family fortune upon the death of their father. They then meet business man Charles and his wife Julie, a would-be thriller writer. Charles is anxious to work with the brothers on property deals, and so encourages David, who is also a writer, to co-author a murder story with Julie. It isn’t long before the two concoct the perfect crime, which is soon twisted into a reality…

Original Cast
 The Hon. David Rodingham  – James Donald
 The Hon. Clive Rodingham – Denholm Elliott
 Julie Sturrock – Kim Hunter
 Dr. Elizabeth Woolley – Ethel Griffies
 Charles Sturrock – Torin Thatcher
 Mr. Tibbit – Robert Milli
 Constable Hackett – Herbert Voland

Awards
Knott was awarded an Edgar from the Mystery Writers of America for Best Mystery Play.  He had won an earlier Edgar in this same category for Dial M for Murder.

References

1961 plays
Broadway plays
Thriller plays